Li Yun is a fictional character in Water Margin, one of the Four Great Classical Novels of Chinese literature. Nicknamed "Green Eyed Tiger", he ranks 97th among the 108 Stars of Destiny and 61st among the 72 Earthly Fiends.

Background
The novel depicts Li Yun as having a broad face, thick eyebrows, a red beard and green eyes, which earn him the nickname "Green Eyed Tiger". Skilled in martial arts, especially in the use of sabre, he could fight several men at the same time. He is the chief constable in Yishui County, located in present-day Linyi in Shandong. He has taught Zhu Fu martial arts.

Becoming an outlaw
Li Kui goes back to his home in Yishui county to fetch his mother to Liangshan.  But he gets into trouble when his identity is exposed after he killed four tigers on the Yi Ridge which had eaten his mother. Earlier he had killed a highwayman Li Gui who had posed as him, but the impostor's wife got away having learnt that he is the famous outlaw Li Kui. When Li Kui is being acclaimed as a tiger slayer in the village at the foot of Yi Ridge, Li Gui's wife recognises him and informs a Squire Cao. Li Kui is drugged and tied up. The magistrate of Yishui, upon receiving Cao's report, sends an escort party led by chief constable Li Yun to take Li Kui to his office. 

Zhu Gui, who is sent by Song Jiang to Yishui to keep tabs on Li Kui to ensure his safety, wants to rescue Li by force. But his brother Zhu Fu, who runs an inn in the village, suggests a plan. The brothers pretend to give the escort party a send-off treat in celebration of their big catch. As Zhu Fu has been his martial arts student, Li Yun, together with his men, unsuspectingly drinks the spiked wine he offers. Once the group is out cold, the Zhu brothers free Li Kui, who kills all the constables but spares Li Yun as Zhu Fu intervenes. When Li Yun comes to, he catches up with the three and fights with Li Kui. Then Zhu Fu interposes and convinces Li Yun to join Liangshan by emphasising to him that he has no other choice.

Campaigns and death
Li Yun is put in charge of building houses on Liangshan after the 108 Stars of Destiny came together in what is called the Grand Assembly. He participates in the campaigns against the Liao invaders and rebel forces in Song territory following amnesty from Emperor Huizong for Liangshan.

In the battle of Shezhou in the campaign against Fang La, Li Yun encounters Wang Yin, one of Fang's key lieutenants. Although Li Yun manages to corner Wang, he could not move in to kill the latter as he is on foot and the other on horseback. He is eventually trampled to death by Wang's horse.

References
 
 
 
 
 
 
 

72 Earthly Fiends
Fictional characters from Shandong